Clint Crisher (born January 23, 1973) is an American pop singer and songwriter. He is believed to be the first American R&B or pop singer to be openly gay from the beginning of his career.

Biography
Crisher was born on January 23, 1973, in Enterprise, Alabama, to a Christian family. His mother, Brenda, was of French Canadian descent, and his father, Glen Peacock, is a first-generation Italian American. The Peacock family originated from London, England; his mother worked as a Las Vegas dancer. Crisher was raised in Jacksonville, Florida, by his sister.

Career
After graduating from high school in Fernandina Beach, Florida, Crisher studied at Florida State College at Jacksonville. He transferred colleges and received his BA from Jacksonville University. Living in Washington, DC, Crisher began performing his own original music regularly in local D.C. clubs and events including the Velvet Nation party at Nation, Tracks, Millennium at the 9:30 Club, Ozone, The Capitol Ballroom,and Cobalt and in NYC nightclubs Metronome, Avalon, Splash, Webster Hall, Starlight, and Home. Crisher performed along major DJ's and club promoters saw him and started hiring him for larger performances. His career as a dance performance artist and club personality began in Washington, DC, continued in Miami at Crobar and eventually landed him in Los Angeles. Crisher performed on the main stage with the United States Capitol building in the background for the 1999 and 2003 Capital Pride annual LGBT pride festival in Washington, D.C. with over 150,000 attendees and also in July 2002 Crisher performed as part of the Billboard Dance Music Summit.

Discography
Albums
 1999: Perfect World
 2007: Terrific Distraction (Crisher Entertainment)
 2008: Spotlight "The Remixes" (Crisher Entertainment) 2007 #5 Billboard Breakout Hot Dance Club Play November 2007
 2008: It Can Happen To You "The Remixes"(Crisher Entertainment) #38 week of December 8–14, 2008 on the zipDj TOP 40 Canada National Dance Charts included in industry publication Cashbox (magazine)
 2008: The Hot Boys World Volume 1 (Crisher Entertainment)
 2008: The Hot Boys World Volume 2 (Crisher Entertainment) 
 2009: The Hot Boys World Volume 3 (Crisher Entertainment) 
 2010: TraXXX 123 RemiXed (Crisher Entertainment) 
 2010: The Hot Boys World Volume 4 (Crisher Entertainment) 
 2011: The Hot Boys World Volume 5 (Crisher Entertainment) 
 2011: Sticky Remixes (Crisher Entertainment)

See also
 Youth pride

References

External links
 
 
 

Living people
1973 births
People from Enterprise, Alabama
American dance musicians
American male pop singers
American male singer-songwriters
American tenors
American LGBT singers
American LGBT songwriters
American gay musicians
Jacksonville University alumni
Gay singers
Gay songwriters
21st-century American male singers
21st-century American singers
20th-century American LGBT people
21st-century American LGBT people
Singer-songwriters from Alabama
American gay writers